Brian Leslie France (born 9 July 1939) is a former Australian rules footballer who played for the West Perth Football Club in the Western Australian National Football League (WANFL) between 1958 and 1967. He was inducted in to the West Australian Football Hall of Fame in 2007, and is a member of the West Perth Team of the Century.

Biography
France was recruited by West Perth from Mount Hawthorn. He made his debut in round one of the 1959 season, aged 19. Standing  and weighing , France quickly established himself in the West Perth line-up, winning a premiership in his second season as the Cardinals defeated archrivals East Perth by 32 points in the grand final. A bullocking centre half-back, he twice won the Breckler Medal as West Perth's best and fairest, in 1963 and 1965.

France made his state debut in August 1962, against South Australia at Subiaco Oval. He would play nine state games in total, including four in the 1966 Australian National Football Carnival in Hobart. In the 1966 WANFL season, France polled 18 Sandover Medal votes to finish third overall, just behind Bill Walker (20 votes) and Barry Cable (19 votes). He was in stellar form early the following year, but in round fourteen suffered a career-ending knee injury and never played again. Despite this he still polled 18 Sandover votes, finishing runner-up behind equal winners Bill Walker and John Parkinson.

References

1939 births
Australian rules footballers from Western Australia
West Perth Football Club players
West Australian Football Hall of Fame inductees
Living people